The Women's Draughts World Championship is the world championship in international draughts organized by the World Draughts Federation (FMJD). The championship occurs every two years. In the even year following the tournament must take place the World Title match.

The women's championship began in 1973 in the Netherlands and has had winners from the Soviet Union, Latvia, Ukraine, Russia and Poland. The current women's champion is Matrena Nogovitsyna. The player who has won most times is Zoja Golubeva, who previously won the championship fifteen times.

The World Title Match
The championship is held every two years, in the odd years. The World Title match must take place in the even year following the world championship (tournament). Right for the World Title Match has former champion and new champion, if former champion has retained his title in the World Championship tournament he have right for the match with the player ended on the second place in the World Championship tournament.

Classic

Rapid

Blitz

See also
List of women's Draughts World Championship winners
Draughts World Championship

References

External links
Results in database KNDB
World Championships Women 1973-2011
World Championships Blitz

Draughts world championships
Draughts
Draughts competitions
Recurring sporting events established in 1973